Northwest Rangers is a 1942 American Metro-Goldwyn-Mayer Northern second feature film that is a remake of Manhattan Melodrama set in the North-West Mounted Police of Canada. It was also known as Gambler's Choice.

Plot
A mountie tracks down a former childhood friend.

Cast
	James Craig as Frank 'Blackie' Marshall
William Lundigan as James Kevin Gardiner
Patricia Dane as Jean Avery
John Carradine as Martin Caswell
Jack Holt as Duncan Frazier
Keenan Wynn as "Slip" O'Mara
Grant Withers as Fowler
Darryl Hickman as 'Blackie' – as a Boy
Drew Roddy as Jim – as a Boy

Production
The film was a remake of Manhattan Melodrama and was originally called Gambler's Choice. It was the feature directorial debut for Joe Newman, who had made a number of short films for MGM as well as having worked as an assistant director at the studio for many years. The leads were to be Patricia Dane, William Lundigan and John Carroll. The lead role was given to James Craig.

Filming started in June 1942.

Reception
The film earned $313,000 in the US and Canada and $146,000 elsewhere, making a loss of $12,000.

The Chicago Daily Tribune praised the "likeable performers".

References

External links

1942 films
Metro-Goldwyn-Mayer films
1942 Western (genre) films
Films directed by Joseph M. Newman
Films scored by Daniele Amfitheatrof
Royal Canadian Mounted Police in fiction
Remakes of American films
American Western (genre) films
American black-and-white films
1942 directorial debut films
1940s English-language films
1940s American films